Still Life in Motion is a remix album by trance DJ BT, released in November 2001. It was released in the United Kingdom only. It contains various remixes from BT's third studio album, Movement in Still Life. It also contains four unmixed B-sides, released on the United States version of Movement in Still Life only.

Track listing

References

BT (musician) compilation albums
2001 remix albums